Una Chi (born Bruna Bianchi; Milan, 5 June 1942 – Cisternino, 19 January 2021) was an Italian translator and writer.

Life

Bruna Bianchi was born in Milan in 1942. For many years she was a professor of German literature at the University of Milan. She translated into Italian several German literature masterpieces, including Günter Grass' From the Diary of a Snail (Aus dem Tagebuch einer Schnecke) (Einaudi, Turin, 1974); Max von der Grün's Stellenweise Glatteis (Strada sdrucciolevole, Einaudi, 1977); Max Frisch's Bluebeard (Einaudi, 1984); and Martin Walser's Das Einhorn (Unicorno, Feltrinelli, 1969). She also translated works by Goethe and Thomas Mann.

In 1994 she published her first novel, E duro campo di battaglia il letto. under the pseudonym Una Chi (Italian for "One Who"). She then authored three more erotica books, mostly conspicuous for her scholarly and coldly analytical prose and the crudeness of her narrative.

In 1999 she translated a revised Italian edition of Grass's The Tin Drum (Il tamburo di latta).

Works

 1994: E duro campo di battaglia il letto, ES, 1994 ;
 1995: Il sesso degli angeli, ES, 1995 ;
 1997: Ti vedo meglio al buio, ES, 1998 ;
 2000: L'ultimo desiderio, ES, 2000

References

External links 

1942 births
2021 deaths
Writers from Milan
20th-century Italian novelists
21st-century Italian novelists
Italian women novelists
20th-century Italian women writers
21st-century Italian women writers
Italian translators
Women erotica writers
Germanists
Translators of Johann Wolfgang von Goethe
Translators of Thomas Mann
Pseudonymous women writers
20th-century pseudonymous writers
21st-century pseudonymous writers
German–Italian translators